The Poacher from Egerland is a 1934 Czechoslovak-Austrian drama film directed by Vladimír Majer and starring Oskar Marion, Frantisek Šlégr and Markéta Krausová. Walter Kolm-Veltée directed the German voiceovers.

Cast
 Oskar Marion as District forest officer Karel Černý  
 František Šlégr as Poacher
 Markéta Krausová as Lída
 Vladimír Pospíšil-Born as Landowner Bruno Walter  
 Truda Binarová as Mary Walter
 Valentin Šindler  as Barrel organ player
 Marie Holanová as Lída's aunt
 Bedřich Frank as Forest worker
 Josef Oliak as Physician
 Karel Postránecký as Gendarme
 R.A. Dvorský as Hotel orchestra conductor

References

External links 
 

1934 films
1934 drama films
Czech drama films
Austrian drama films
Czechoslovak drama films
1930s Czech-language films
1930s German-language films
Films about hunters
Czech black-and-white films
Austrian black-and-white films
1934 multilingual films
Czech multilingual films
Czechoslovak multilingual films
Austrian multilingual films
1930s Czech films